Lockwood is an unincorporated community and census-designated place (CDP) in Amador County, California, United States. It is located north of Volcano and west of Amador Pines. It was first listed as a CDP prior to the 2020 census.

References 

Census-designated places in Amador County, California
Census-designated places in California